Trioceros fuelleborni, the Ngosi Volcano chameleon or Poroto three-horned chameleon, is a species of chameleon endemic to Tanzania.

References

Trioceros
Reptiles described in 1900
Taxa named by Gustav Tornier
Reptiles of Tanzania